Huanyam, Wañam, or Pawumwa may refer to:
 Huanyam people, a historic ethnic group of Brazil
 Huanyam language, an extinct language of Brazil

Language and nationality disambiguation pages